Cavenham Heath is a National Nature Reserve, near Cavenham, Suffolk. It is both a  Regionally Important Geological/Geomorphological Sites (RIGS) and a Site of Special Scientific Interest.

References

Nature reserves in Suffolk